Mairéad Ní Mhaonaigh (born 26 July 1959) is an Irish fiddler and the lead vocalist for the Irish folk music band Altan, which she co-founded with her late husband Frankie Kennedy in 1987. Today, Mairéad is recognised as a leading exponent in the Donegal fiddle tradition, and she is often considered one of the foremost singers in the Irish language, her native tongue. She was part of the Irish supergroup T with the Maggies who performed in January 2009 at Temple Bar TradFest in Dublin their first ever two concerts under that name and who released in October 2010 their debut (and to date only) album. After nearly 22 years with Altan, Mairéad premiered in 28 December 2008 in Gweedore (during the Frankie Kennedy Winter Music School) her debut solo album Imeall which was later released worldwide in February 2009. After 29 years with Altan, Mairéad released in October 2016 her alternate band Na Mooneys' debut album Na Mooneys.

Background
Ní Mhaonaigh grew up in Gweedore, County Donegal, on the northwest coast of Ireland. Her father, Proinsias Ó Maonaigh, who got married in 1954, taught her to play the fiddle. She received tuition from fiddler Dinny McLaughlin, who was a frequent visitor to the home when she was young. Ciarán Tourish, who would later join Altan, was also a frequent visitor to the family home and also received tuition from McLaughlin.

Ní Mhaonaigh has two siblings: 
Her brother Gearóid Ó Maonaigh was an executive in an office for long years, played guitar for Ragairne (a short-lived band formed by Ní Mhaonaigh and Frankie Kennedy, of which singer Enya was a member), appeared on the album Ceol Aduaidh, and organised the Frankie Kennedy Winter School. 
Her younger sister Anna Ní Mhaonaigh was going from job to job, mostly in film and being PA to various TV projects, has contributed backing vocals to several albums and was a member of the (all female) group Macalla.

She met Frankie Kennedy at a session at age 15. Kennedy was inspired to learn to play and soon became a talented flute player. They married in 1981.

Career

The early 1980s: Mairéad Ní Mhaonaigh & Frankie Kennedy duo, Ragairne 

One evening, during a session in Gweedore (County Donegal), fifteen-year-old fiddle player Mairéad Ní Mhaonaigh, daughter of the session's leader Proinsias Ó Maonaigh, met with Belfast-born eighteen-year-old Frankie Kennedy during his summer trip to the Gaeltacht. They were attracted to each other, and Kennedy wrote to her regularly after leaving Donegal.

Kennedy was advised by a friend that he should learn an instrument if he intended to court Ní Mhaonaigh, and so he got a whistle and taught himself to play. Later he learned the flute, a somewhat louder instrument, so that he could hear himself in sessions. His love for Ní Mhaonaigh coupled with perfectionist tendencies turned him into a well-respected flute player.

Kennedy and Ní Mhaonaigh married in 1981.

The new couple continued to play at sessions in Donegal, and this formed the basis for their musical partnership. They made their recording debut on Albert Fry's eponymous record in 1979 and later formed a short-lived group called Ragairne which also included Gearóid Ó Maonaigh, Ní Mhaonaigh's brother, on guitar, Donal O'Hanlon from Newry on guitar, vocals and cittern and was rejoined in 1981 by singer Eithne Ní Bhraonáin, later known as Enya.

Joined by bouzouki player Ciarán Curran and Eithne Ní Bhraonáin, now known as Enya, on synthesizer, Frankie Kennedy and Mairéad Ní Mhaonaigh released a recording entitled Ceol Aduaidh on Gael-Linn records in 1983.

At the time, Kennedy and Ní Mhaonaigh were earning their living by teaching at St. Oliver Plunkett National School in Malahide, north County Dublin. But live performances in 1984 and 1985, particularly in the United States, convinced them that there was an audience for "no-compromise traditional music played with heart and drive," and they were persuaded to give up teaching.

During this time, the group added guitarist Mark Kelly and released in 1987 a record called Altan, named after a lake in Donegal, although the name Altan wasn't used for the band on that release. Altan was produced by Dónal Lunny, who subsequently appeared as either a producer or guest musician on every Altan album which followed.

1987–present: Altan

Forsaking their jobs as teachers, Ní Mhaonaigh and Kennedy formed the band Altan during the late 1980s. Kennedy's death from cancer in 1994 put the band's future in question, but she decided to continue at Kennedy's explicit request.

As well as her work with Altan, Ní Mhaonaigh over the years has presented traditional music programmes on radio and television, including the radio show, The Long Note and the television series, The Pure Drop.

2005–present: String Sisters

Ní Mhaonaigh is a member of the fiddle ensemble String Sisters active as a band since 2005.

2007–present: T with the Maggies

Ní Mhaonaigh along with friends Moya Brennan, Maighread Ní Dhomhnaill and Tríona Ní Dhomhnaill came together as T with the Maggies in 2007, and released their debut album T with the Maggies in October 2010.

2007–present: Solo work & solo live performances

In 2007/08, Ní Mhaonaigh recorded Imeall, her debut (studio) album in the home studio of her friend and musician/co-producer Manus Lunny in Tír Chonaill, County Donegal, Ireland. On 28 December 2008, at the Frankie Kennedy Winter Music School in Gweedore, Ní Mhaonaigh premiered live some songs from the album in an intimate concert with Lunny. For this occasion, she also released a small number of copies of the album. On 12 February 2009, the album was officially launched in Dublin and released worldwide. Only 3000 physical copies were pressed and made available worldwide from her website. The title is Irish for 'Edge' or 'Threshold' and the album features traditional/folk songs as well as new compositions by Ní Mhaonaigh.

Ní Mhaonaigh previously performed two special concerts in January 2008 at the Temple Bar TradFest with long-time friends Moya Brennan, Maighread Ní Dhomhnaill and Tríona Ní Dhomhnaill. It was the second time the four musicians ever performed together. It was also the first time Ní Mhaonaigh performed live some songs from her then yet-to-be (worldwide) released solo album Imeall. For the occasion, she was joined by special guests who spent the last few years recording with her.

Since February 2009, Ní Mhaonaigh (fiddle, lead vocals) has toured solo and (mostly) as a trio with Manus Lunny (bouzouki) & James Higgins (percussions). She has also guested a few times with other musicians such as French flutist Sylvain Barou (in June 2013 in Calais, France and in April 2014 in L'Île-d'Yeu, France) and French violinist Didier Lockwood (also in June 2013 in Calais).

Mairéad also contributed a track, Má Théid Tú Chun Aonaigh to the Irish charitable album Ceol Cheann Dubhrann which was released in December 2009 to raise funds for two projects in Ranafast, a Gaeltacht area from which Mairéad has collected songs.

Mairéad performed live on 28 January 2018 at Rathfarnham Castle, Dublin, Ireland.

Along with her daughter Nia Byrne and her long-time fellow friend, neighbour and producer Manus Lunny, she performed live (before a backstage audience) a (39:50) set of tunes and songs on 3 October 2020 at the Cork Opera as part of the Cork Folk Festival. The live performance was filmed and the stream video was made available through the Cork Folk Festival Facebook page.

On 17 January 2021, Mairéad Ní Mhaonaigh announced that "[she'd] been really busy composing music for the An Grianán Theatre, Letterkenny, Co Donegal", to be part of this year's Letterkenny Trad Week 2021. The song for the suite she composed is entitled "Ré an tSolais" which means "The Time of Light". Mairéad Ní Mhaonaigh and Friends Full Concert was held as a live stream on Sunday evening 24 January 2021 (at 8pm GMT) (€10 per household) during Letterkenny Trad Week 2021 at the An Grianán Theatre. Benefits were due to go to Donegal Cancer Flights and Services and Donegal Hospice.

On 5 March 2021, Mairead announced that her new music piece "Ré an tSolais" would be broadcast on TG4 as part of a show due to be performed on St Patrick's Day 2021 (at 9:30pm GMT). Indeed, Mairéad Ní Mhaonaigh teamed up with friends for this televised concert on TG4 on 17 March 2021, also called "Ré an tSolais". Along with this new composition, the show featured other new Mairéad Ní Mhaonaigh music like "An Grianstad" / "The Halting Sun" (2020) and "Scread na Bealtaine" (2020), and some of her original music pieces. Mairéad was joined by special guests including Manus Lunny, members of Altan, her nephew (and Na Mooneys fellow band member) Ciarán Ó Maonaigh, and the Harrigan and McGrory families (as openers).

2013–present: Na Mooneys
On 7 January 2016, Mairéad Ní Mhaonaigh announced on her Facebook page that the new band called Na Mooneys that she had formed (along with her nephew Ciarán Ó Maonaigh and her siblings Anna Ní Mhaonaigh and Gearóid Ó Maonaigh) two years earlier (during the last Frankie Kennedy Winter School where they performed their first ever show) were in the process of recording their debut family album. On their Facebook page (created on 7 January 2016), the band describe themselves as «a family of musicians & singers from the Donegal Gaeltacht» playing Irish traditional music.

On 6 February 2016, the new band Na Mooneys announced that they were just near the end of the recording of their debut album in Manus Lunny's studio, with Anna and Mairéad Ní Mhaonaigh putting down some vocals for a few songs, before to get ready for the mix.

On 4 June 2016, Na Mooneys took part in the "Féile Ceoil" event ("music festival" in Irish Gaelic) in Gweedore, County Donegal, Ireland.

On 30 June 2016, Na Mooneys announced that they are due to perform on 12 July 2016 at Ionad Cois Locha, Dún Lúiche, Ireland, during the Trad Trathnona ("Trad Afternoon"), County Donegal's Summer of traditional Sessions (to occur each Tuesday in July & August).

On 9 September 2016, Na Mooneys announced that they are due to perform their Dublin debut show on 29 January 2017 at St. Michan's Church during the Temple Bar TradFest.

On 19 September 2016, Na Mooneys announced the (then forthcoming) release on 6 October 2016 of Na Mooneys, their debut (eponymous) album «of Irish traditional music and song from the Donegal Gaeltacht», revealed its 15-track list and made available a streaming audio version of the first track from it, "Dónal na Gealaí". The album line-up includes Mairéad Ní Mhaonaigh on fiddle & song, Gearóid Ó Maonaigh on guitar, Anna Ní Mhaonaigh on whistle & song and Ciarán Ó Maonaigh on fiddle & octave fiddle with special guests Nia Byrne on fiddle & song, Manus Lunny on bouzouki & keyboards and Caitlín Nic Gabhann on concertina, foot percussion & dance.

2018–present: The SíFiddlers

The SíFiddlers are a group of 13 female Donegal fiddlers including Na Mooneys (indeed, "The SíFiddlers" can be translated from Irish to English as "The She Fiddlers") who first came together in Summer 2018 during the Earagail Arts Festival. Their performance at the festival was a huge success, concluding with upwards of 30 fellow female fiddlers from Donegal joining the SíFiddlers on stage for an epic finale celebrating the healthy state of female fiddling in Donegal at present. The 13 members are:
 Denise Boyle from Glenties
 Tara Connaghan from Glenties
 Liz Doherty from Buncrana
 Aisling Drost-Byrne from Glencolmcille
 Clare Friel (from The Friel Sisters) from Derrynamansher
 Claire Gallagher from Kilcar
 Brid Harper from Castlefinn
 Melanie Houton from Malin
 Theresa Kavanagh from Gortahork
 Eimear McColgan from Malin
 Roisin McGrory from Culdaff
 Mairead Ni Mhaonaigh from Gaoth Dobhair
 Clodagh Warnock from Moville

On 3 September 2019, the Donegal fiddle music band The SíFiddlers announced, via their Facebook page, that they were recording their debut album.

On 1 July 2020, The SíFiddlers released (first, on digital format, for download only) their (12-track) debut album, simply entitled Donegal Fiddle. Physical copies were due to be available around the 5 July 2020.

Siobhan Peoples (daughter of Tommy Peoples) warmly reviewed the album.

Fall 2022: Irish (& UK) concert tour with Cormac De Barra & Mark Redmond
On 4 September 2022, it was announced that Mairéad Ní Mhaonaigh (fiddle / vocals) would do a 9-date autumnal Irish (& UK) concert tour from 14 September to 2 October 2022 with harpist Cormac De Barra (harp / vocals) and piper Mark Redmond (uilleann pipes / flute / whistles) in Dublin, Dún Laoghaire, Tinahely, Baile Mhúirne, Hammersmith (London), Clifden, Belmullet, Newbridge, Cork (€5-€25).

Personal life
Ní Mhaonaigh had a daughter named Nia Byrne (Nia Ní Bheirn) (born on 8 October 2003) with fellow Altan musician Dermot Byrne, whom she married in October 1999. Ní Mhaonaigh and Byrne went separate ways before her first solo album in 2009.

Accolades
Ní Mhaonaigh was named "Donegal Person of the Year" in 2009.

Ní Mhaonaigh has been honoured on 14 December 2016 with the 2017 "Gradam Ceoil TG4" award for "Traditional Musician of the Year".

Discography

Solo albums
2009 Imeall

As Frankie Kennedy & Mairéad Ní Mhaonaigh
1983 Ceol Aduaidh
1987 Altan

With Altan
1989 Horse with a Heart
1990 The Red Crow
1991 Harvest Storm
1993 Island Angel
1996 Blackwater
1997 Runaway Sunday
2000 Another Sky
2002 The Blue Idol
2005 Local Ground
2010 25th Anniversary Celebration (a compilation of studio re-recordings of previous material (plus one new song) with orchestral arrangements)
2012 Gleann Nimhe - The Poison Glen
2015 The Widening Gyre
2018 The Gap of Dreams

With String Sisters
2007 Live (CD/DVD)

With T with the Maggies
2010 T with the Maggies

With Na Mooneys 
2016 Na Mooneys
2017 "Soilse na Nollag" (4:26), single released on 17 December 2017 by Na Mooneys and Manus Lunny (A Christmas Song or Carol, composed by Francie Mooney and Mairéad Ní Mhaonaigh (his daughter)

With The SíFiddlers 
2020 Donegal Fiddle

Guest roles
1991 Albert Fry (Albert Fry)
1991 Fiddle Sticks (various artists)
1993 The Holy Ground (Mary Black)
1994 Lullaby: A Collection (various artists - Ní Mhaonaigh sings The Cradle Song, wrongly attributed to Karan Casey)
2001 Little Sparrow (Dolly Parton)
2001 Volume 3: Further in Time (Afro Celt Sound System)
2008 Tráthnóna Beag Aréir (Albert Fry)
2008 The Original Transatlantic Sessions DVD (various artists)

Notes

References

External links
Official website
Profile at Altan.ie

Sources
 
 
 
 

1959 births
20th-century Irish women singers
Living people
Irish fiddlers
Irish folk singers
Irish-language singers
Musicians from County Donegal
People from Gweedore
Altan (band) members
T with the Maggies members
String Sisters members
21st-century Irish women singers
21st-century violinists